The Palawan flycatcher (Ficedula platenae) is a species of bird in the family Muscicapidae.
It is endemic to the Philippines found only in the region of Palawan. Its natural habitat is tropical moist lowland forests.
It is threatened by habitat loss.

Description 
EBird describes the bird as "A small bird of lowland and foothill forest on Palawan. Favors undergrowth with palms or bamboo. Dark-brown above with a white belly, an orange chest and tail, and very pale orange on the throat and under the base of the tail. Similar to female Palawan blue flycatcher, but smaller, with a brown rather than gray head. "

The Palawan Flycatcher has a very unusual and distinct call.  Song is a soft whistled “puu-puu piii!” with the third note higher. Also gives a repeated upslurred “puuii.This call gets repeated anywhere from 10 to 15 times in quick repetition.  Then it gets followed by a short 5-10 second trill.  The bird also will fan out and shake its tail while doing this call.  This call very insect-like call often gets mistaken as an insect's call.

Habitat and Conservation Status 
It inhabits primary and secondary dipterocarp forest up to 1,000 meters above sea level. It favours areas rich in rattan, bamboo and palm trees. While they can somewhat tolerate secondary forest, they appear to be sensitive to habitat modification  It is often found on the lower understory and close to the forest floor. They have been noted to be very faithful to their favoured sites.

It has been assessed as vulnerable with a population currently between 6,000 and 15,000, the Palawan Flycatcher has attracted help from conservation groups.  These groups have created protected areas on these islands where logging can't occur.  By doing this, the primary source of their decline is lessened.  Conservation groups attempted to cultivate and restore the lands which their species was wiped from.  Unlike most species, the Palawan Flycatcher did not return to these lands after the restoration back to old growth.

The species is present in conservation areas - the entirety of Palawan has been designated a biosphere reserve but actual protection and enforcement against logging and hunting has been difficult. They are present in the protected area of the Puerto Princesa Subterranean River National Park. 

Conservation actions proposed include  surveys in remaining lowland forests in order to better understand population and distribution, habitat and tolerance for degradation. Support the proposed extension of Puerto Princesa Subterranean River National Park and formally protect other key sites in Iwahig Prison and Penal Farm and Mt. Victoria.

References

Palawan flycatcher
Birds of Palawan
Palawan flycatcher
Palawan flycatcher
Taxonomy articles created by Polbot